March 25 - Eastern Orthodox liturgical calendar - March 27

All fixed commemorations below are observed on April 8 by Orthodox Churches on the Old Calendar.

For March 26th, Orthodox Churches on the Old Calendar commemorate the Saints listed on March 13.

Feasts

 Synaxis of the Archangel Gabriel.
 Apodosis (Leavetaking) of the Annunciation.

Saints

 Martyr Codratus (Quadratus), Emmanuel and Theodosius, and with them 40 other martyrs, who suffered under Diocletian (284-305)
 Hieromartyr Theodore, with Irenaeus the Deacon, and Serapion and Ammonius the lectors, in Pentapolis in Libya (304)
 Hieromartyr Irenaeus, Bishop of Sirmium in Hungary (304)  (see also: March 25)
 Hieromartyr Montanus, priest, and his wife Maxima, at Sirmium (ca. 304)
 Martyrs Philemon and Domninus of Thessalonica, in Italy.  (see also: March 21)
 Hieromartyr Eusebius, Bishop of Kival, and Martyr Pullius the Reader.
 Saint Eutychius, Subdeacon, of Alexandria (356)
 Holy 26 Martyrs in Gothia by burning, under the Crimean Goths, under the Gothic King Jungerich (375-383), including:
 Bathusius and Bercus, presbyters;
 Monk-martyr Arpilus;
 Laymen martyrs: Abibus, Agnus (Hagias), Reasus (Ruias), Igathrax (Egathrax), Iscoeus (Iskous, Eskoes, Escoos), Silas, Signicus (Sigetzas), Sonerilas (Swerilas), Suimbalus (Swemblas), Thermus (Therthas), Phillus (Philgas);
 Laywomen martyrs: Anna, Alla (Alas), Larissa (Baren, Beride), Monco (Manca, Moiko), Mamica (Kamika), Uirko (Virko, Oneko), Animais (Animaida, Anemais), Gaatha the queen of the Goths, and Duklida (Dulcilla).
 Saint Malchus of Chalcis in Syria (4th century)  (see also: November 24)
 Venerable Abraham of Mount Latros (Latrium), ascetic.  (see also: March 24)
 Venerable Stephen the Confessor and Wonderworker, Abbot of Tryglia (815)
 Venerable Basil the Younger, anchorite near Constantinople (944 or 952)

Pre-Schism Western saints

 Martyr Castulus, an officer of the palace in Rome, tortured and buried alive for helping other Orthodox (288)  (see also: December 18)
 Martyrs Peter, Marcian, John, Thecla, Cassian and others, at Rome.
 Saint Felix of Trier, consecrated Bishop of Trier in Germany by St Martin of Tours in 386 (ca. 400)
 Saint Sincheall, a disciple of St Patrick and founder of the monastery of Killeigh in Offaly, where there were 150 monks (5th century)
 Saint Govan, hermit of Pembrokeshire (586)
 Saint Mocheallóg (Cellog, Mottelog, Motalogus), patron saint of Kilmallock in Limerick in Ireland (ca.639)
 Saint Braulio of Saragossa in Iberia, Bishop and Confessor (646)
 Saint Garbhan (Garbán), a saint who left his name to Dungarvan in Ireland (7th century)
 Saint Ludger, missionary bishop in the Netherlands and northwestern Germany (809)
 Saint Bertilo, Abbot of St Benignus Abbey in Dijon in France, martyred with several of his monks at the altar when the Vikings sacked the monastery (ca. 878-888)
 Saint Felicitas of Padua, nun, probably at Sts Cosmas and Damian in Padua in Italy (9th century)

Post-Schism Orthodox saints

 New Martyr George of Sofia, at Adrianople (1437)

New martyrs and confessors

 Martyr Parasceva Kochneva (1939)

Other commemorations

 Melitina Icon of the Theotokos.

Icon gallery

Notes

References

Sources
 March 26/April 8. Orthodox Calendar
 April 8 / March 26. Holy Trinity Russian Orthodox Church (A parish of the Patriarchate of Moscow).
 March 26. OCA - The Lives of the Saints.
 The Autonomous Orthodox Metropolia of Western Europe and the Americas (ROCOR). St. Hilarion Calendar of Saints for the year of our Lord 2004. St. Hilarion Press (Austin, TX). p. 24.
 March 26. Latin Saints of the Orthodox Patriarchate of Rome.
 The Roman Martyrology. Transl. by the Archbishop of Baltimore. Last Edition, According to the Copy Printed at Rome in 1914. Revised Edition, with the Imprimatur of His Eminence Cardinal Gibbons. Baltimore: John Murphy Company, 1916. pp. 87–88.
 Rev. Richard Stanton. A Menology of England and Wales, or, Brief Memorials of the Ancient British and English Saints Arranged According to the Calendar, Together with the Martyrs of the 16th and 17th Centuries. London: Burns & Oates, 1892. pp. 134–135.
Greek Sources
 Great Synaxaristes:  26 ΜΑΡΤΙΟΥ. ΜΕΓΑΣ ΣΥΝΑΞΑΡΙΣΤΗΣ.
  Συναξαριστής. 26 Μαρτίου. ECCLESIA.GR. (H ΕΚΚΛΗΣΙΑ ΤΗΣ ΕΛΛΑΔΟΣ).
Russian Sources
  8 апреля (26 марта). Православная Энциклопедия под редакцией Патриарха Московского и всея Руси Кирилла (электронная версия). (Orthodox Encyclopedia - Pravenc.ru).
  26 марта (ст.ст.) 8 апреля 2013 (нов. ст.). Русская Православная Церковь Отдел внешних церковных связей. (DECR).

March in the Eastern Orthodox calendar